Ian Miles (born 15 October 1952) is  a former Australian rules footballer who played with Richmond in the Victorian Football League (VFL).

Notes

External links 
		

Living people
1952 births
Australian rules footballers from Victoria (Australia)
Richmond Football Club players